Steve Elkins (born April 17, 1952) is an American politician serving in the Minnesota House of Representatives since 2019. A member of the Minnesota Democratic–Farmer–Labor Party (DFL), Elkins represents District 50B in the southwestern Twin Cities metropolitan area, which includes the city of Bloomington and parts of Hennepin County, Minnesota.

Early life, education, and career
Elkins attended University of California, Berkeley, graduating with a Bachelor of Arts in economics.

Elkins was a member of the Bloomington city council for 10 years until he was appointed to the Metropolitan Council in 2011. He is an IT architect.

Minnesota House of Representatives
Elkins was first elected to the Minnesota House of Representatives in 2018, succeeding incumbent Paul Rosenthal who did not seek another term, and has been reelected every two years since. Elkins serves as vice-chair of the Veterans and Military Affairs Finance and Policy Committee, and sits on the Health Finance and Policy, Taxes, and Transportation Finance and Policy Committees as well as the Property Tax Division of the Taxes Committee.

Electoral history

Personal life
Elkins and his wife, Judy, have two children. He resides in Bloomington, Minnesota.

References

External links

 Official House of Representatives website
 Official campaign website

1952 births
Living people
People from Bloomington, Minnesota
University of California, Berkeley alumni
Minnesota city council members
Democratic Party members of the Minnesota House of Representatives
21st-century American politicians